Los Jardines are phantom islands supposedly located northeast of the Mariana Islands, near Guam.  

Los Jardines may also refer to:

Los Jardines (Dominican Republic), a Santo Domingo sector
Los Jardines station (Caracas), Venezuela
Los Jardines station (Lima Metro), Peru